Man o' War Cove (or Man of War Bay and similar names) lies on the Dorset coast in southern England and is flanked by the rocky, steep and slightly projecting headlands of Durdle Door to the west and Man O War (or O' War) Head to the east.

Features
A line of pronounced rocks takes up the far side of the cove at the distance of the great Durdle Door headland to the east; these partially enclose the cove, and have few submerged components and feature mostly at the east end of the bay — map-recorded as "The Man o' War". It is usually possible to walk along a thin strand of high tide, dry sand linking the cove to the rest of St Oswald's Bay an area almost entirely visible from the west side of the cove.

Definition and local context
The UK Ordnance Survey maps have local bay names at 1:50000 and 1:25000; these record the pronounced crescent as Man o' War Cove, in turn forming part of St Oswald's Bay reduced to a long gentle arc to the east, about five times the width of the cove. A technical distinction is possible as to the water rather than the solid features of the crescent, in that the cove the bay encloses is Man o' War Cove. St Oswald's Bay is in turn protected from Atlantic surf by south Devon and by closer Portland Bill forming the multi-cove Weymouth Bay, before the even greater recess of Christchurch or Poole Bay which in its greater definition takes in the area of sea east of Swanage on the Purbeck peninsula.

Access 
It is also connected to the South West Coast Path, so it is possible to park elsewhere along the trail and access the cove by foot.

See also 
 Geology of Dorset
 Jurassic Coast

References

External links 
 Ian West's Geology of the Wessex Coast Field Guide, including photographs

Jurassic Coast
Coves of Dorset